, released as Animal Crossing: Let's Go to the City in PAL territories, is a 2008 social simulation video game developed and published by Nintendo for the Wii console and the third game in the Animal Crossing series. It is also one of the first titles that was re-released as a part of the Nintendo Selects collection in 2011.

In City Folk, the player character lives in a rural village populated with anthropomorphic animals, taking part in various activities such as collecting and planting. Similar to other games in the Animal Crossing series the game is synced to the Wii system clock and calendar, allowing the game to be played in real-time and affecting the occurrence of in-game events based on the current time of day or season. City Folk utilizes Nintendo Wi-Fi Connection, allowing players to visit one another's villages via online play. The game is the first Wii title to be compatible with the Wii Speak accessory, which enables voice chat.

City Folk was officially announced at E3 2008 and released later the same year. Upon release it received generally positive reviews from critics and is one of the best-selling games on the Wii with 3.38 million copies sold worldwide.

Gameplay

Animal Crossing: City Folks gameplay is built upon the gameplay of the previous Animal Crossing games. The Wii Remote pointer and motion controls (including the Nunchuk) can be used for handling tools, such as axes, watering cans, slingshots, fishing rods, shovels, and bug-catching nets. Players live in individual houses spread apart from each other, unlike Animal Crossing, in which all four houses are located in a central plaza. Each town begins with six animal residents, and can grow to a maximum of ten (compared to 15 in the original and eight for Wild World). In the previous iterations of Animal Crossing, custom clothing involves a single image that is repeated on the front, back, and sleeves; in City Folk, the player can make separate images for each, which is called a "Pro" design.

The player will be able to celebrate as time progresses through several real-world holidays, such as Christmas Eve, Christmas Day, Thanksgiving, Easter, Father's Day, Mother's Day, and Halloween, although they are named differently in the game itself. Holiday-associated characters from previous games return, as well as new additions such as Zipper T. the Easter Bunny, Pavé (a peacock who celebrates "Festivale"), and Nat (a chameleon who hosts the "Bug-off", a bug catching contest).

Players use a currency known as "bells" in the game. They can get bells by selling items to Nook, the local store owner, such as fish, bugs, fruit, or almost anything they have. Players can save their bells in their own account at the Bank of Nintendo. They may deposit or withdraw bells at the cash machine located at the town hall.

Players have their own house in the game, which is provided by Tom Nook. Nook allows them to pay off their house over time, instead of all at once. They can go to the automatic bell dispenser (ABD) machine to pay off some of this debt whenever they have the money. Once a player pays off a certain amount, their house is upgraded, adding a new story or making the first level of the house bigger. Players may decorate this house anyway they please. The HHA (Happy Home Academy) in the city rates their room, and will pick a room to put on display. Players buy furniture at Tom Nook's, Redd's in the city, or from other animals in their town. Players can use feng shui to earn more HRA points and get luckier in their daily doings, such as catching rare fish or bugs more often.

Players and animals alike can participate in hobbies. These include fishing, bug-catching, fossil finding, and gardening. There is a wide variety of bugs and fish that can be caught, which can be sold or donated to the museum. There is also a large selection of trees and flowers to plant. There are many fossils to be found buried across the village. The player can participate in occasional Bug-Offs or Fishing Tourneys.

The city is a new area added to the game. The player can go there by taking a bus from town, driven by Kapp'n, and once at the city, players can buy clothes, get their hair done, go to a theatre, bid on furniture, and much more. Special characters often appear in the city; these characters include Phineas (who hands out prizes) and Kicks (who polishes shoes).

Online connectivity

Animal Crossing: City Folk is the first Wii game to use Wii Speak, a new microphone option for the Wii that enables voice communication over Nintendo Wi-Fi Connection (WFC). With Wii Speak, all people in a room can communicate with those in another room also containing the device, and can also have live text chat using a USB Keyboard. Players can communicate with other players by sending messages to their town, Wii Message Board, mobile phone, or personal computer.

An auction house run by Lloid, a Gyroid, is available in the city and is where players can auction items to other players via Nintendo WFC. There is also an office for the Happy Room Academy run by Lyle, where players can see how other players' towns are progressing.

As of May 2014, Nintendo Wi-Fi Connection has been terminated and is only possible with homebrew process to connect online.

The game supports Nintendo DS connectivity functionality. Instead of creating a new character, players can import characters from Wild World. Only the character's face, hair (including color and style) and catalog (the items purchasable from Tom Nook) are imported; bells and items owned by the character (including items in the character's inventory, house, town, or dressers) are not transferred. The data in Wild World is not modified when a character is copied to City Folk, so the character can continue to be played on the DS as well. Items from the character's catalog can be repurchased with bells from City Folk. A system error occurred with the Australian version of Let's Go to the City when connecting with the Nintendo DS claiming that it was "the wrong game card". Nintendo Australia allowed gamers to send back their game discs to fix the error to allow compatibility.

Additionally, the Nintendo DS can be used to transfer characters between Wii consoles as a means of visiting other player's towns via DS Download Play.

Downloadable content
Using WiiConnect24, Nintendo periodically sent out downloadable content to online players. These ranged from items to celebrate particular holidays or to commemorate the release of new games. The first item released from Nintendo was the "Red Pikmin Hat". Other items given to players include a "Girl's Day updo" and "Top", Saint Patrick's Day hat, DSi chair (white for EU; black or pink for US), a bag of bells for Tax Day, and a bus model for teacher appreciation week. After summer 2009 began in North America, Nintendo sent players there a hot dog hat, the Dolphin model from Pikmin, ladder shades, a hopscotch flooring, a dresser in the shape of a GameCube, a pile of leaves, an election poster, an anniversary cake, and a Wii locker.

These items can be ordered from Nook's catalog provided that they had been downloaded when they were available. In the case of patterns given by Wendell the Walrus, if they were originally Japanese only, then they will keep their Japanese name if used in a European or American version of the game, while regular items will have English names.

Development
The game was announced as a Wii game that markets the WiiConnect24 feature of the console. In a 2006 interview, Katsuya Eguchi, leader of Animal Crossings production development, stated, "someone could send a letter from their cellphone or from an email address on a PC to the Wii, and then the player living in the town in Animal Crossing could receive that letter." In another interview with IGN, Katsuya Eguchi also discussed how his team continues exploring potential ways to take advantage of the WiiConnect24 feature such as allowing friends to visit other towns or to leave messages while the machine is in standby mode.

Reception

Animal Crossing: City Folk received mixed reviews. The Japanese gaming magazine Famitsu gave it a score of 33/40, lower than the 37/40 scores of its predecessors, while Nintendo Power gave the game an 8.0.  IGN gave the game a 7.5/10, claiming that while the design of the game is sound, they believed it was too much like its predecessors, calling it "a blending of the GameCube and Nintendo DS games" 1UP.com gave the game a C grade, claiming "City Folk seems like a missed opportunity to improve and enhance the series in almost every possible way." X-Play gave the game a 4 out of 5, praising the gameplay and the addition of Wii Speak while finding it too similar to previous titles. The British Official Nintendo Magazine gave the game 90%, saying that the game was "Packed full of Nintendo Charm" and "You'll be playing it for months", but criticized the game as it being "Not new enough for veterans". It was awarded Best Simulation Game for the Wii by IGN in its 2008 video game awards. IGN also nominated it for Best Family Game and Best Online Multiplayer Game. GameSpot also awarded it as being the Least Improved Sequel.

As of January 4, 2009, Animal Crossing: City Folk has sold 949,000 copies in Japan. It was the 10th best-selling game of December 2008 in the United States, selling in excess of 497,000 copies. It is also the eighth best-selling game of Japan in 2009. As of May 2009, Animal Crossing: City Folk has sold 3.38 million copies worldwide.

Notes

References

External links

Official Animal Crossing: City Folk website (North America)
Official Animal Crossing: Let's Go to the City website (GB)
Animal Crossing: City Folk at Nintendo.com

2008 video games
Animal Crossing video games
Games with Wii-DS connectivity
Life simulation games
Nintendo Wi-Fi Connection games
Social simulation video games
Video game sequels
Video games about raccoons
Video games developed in Japan
Video games featuring protagonists of selectable gender
Video games scored by Kazumi Totaka
Video games with customizable avatars
Wii Speak games
Wii Wi-Fi games
Wii-only games
Wii games
Multiplayer and single-player video games

nn:Animal Crossing#Animal Crossing: Let's Go to the City